Pseudaminobacter salicylatoxidans is a Gram-negative, oxidase-positive, rod-shaped, motile bacteria from the genus of Pseudaminobacter which has the ability to oxidizes salicylate.

References

External links
Type strain of Pseudaminobacter salicylatoxidans at BacDive -  the Bacterial Diversity Metadatabase

Phyllobacteriaceae
Bacteria described in 1999